Lee Beach (born 6 October 1982) is a Welsh rugby union player. Lee was born and raised in Maerdy in Rhondda Valleys. Lee started his rugby life playing for his Home Team Maerdy RFC. Lee was noticed by scouts from around Wales and was signed up by Pontypridd RFC at the age of 18. Lee initially played his club rugby for Pontypridd RFC, and was involved with developing other young players as a rugby development officer. he then played for Neath RFC then followed by a couple of years at the Ospreys and then moving to London Welsh.

Lee Beach represented the Wales Sevens squad in 2009 and captained the 2009 IRB Rugby World Cup Sevens winning team in Dubai.

Lee Beach retired from playing professionally in June 2013 and now captains Newport RFC in the Welsh Premiership.

References

External links

1982 births
Living people
London Welsh RFC players
Neath RFC players
Pontypridd RFC players
Rugby union players from Rhondda Cynon Taf
Welsh rugby union players
Ospreys (rugby union) players